The 2016 King's Cup  (also known as the 44th Annual King's Cup Football Tournament) (Thai:) is an international football competition, and will be the 44th edition of the tournament. It was organised by the Football Association of Thailand or the FAT. The tournament is set to be a in knockout tournament format with all matches being held at the Rajamangala Stadium in Bangkok, Thailand on 3 and 5 June.

This edition will feature the host Thailand and three invited teams. The three teams that have been invited are Jordan, United Arab Emirates, and Syria. Montenegro was expected to participate, but later declined, leaving the Thais to put Syria instead.

Participant teams
The 2016 King's Cup is included the following four teams

Squads

Venue
All matches held at the Rajamangala Stadium in Bangkok, Thailand

Draw

The seeded teams which headed up each group was announced on May 10, 2016: United Arab Emirates and Jordan (Top Half), Thailand and Syria (Bottom Half).

This ceremony was drawn by Watchara Watcharapol, CEO of Thairath TV and  Supasin Leelarit, Vice chairman of 2016 King's Cup Organizing Committee.

Match officials
The following referees were chosen for the 2016 King's Cup.
Referees
 Sukhbir Singh  
 Aziz Asimov
 Nafeez Abdul Wahab
 Khamis Al-Marri 
Assistant referees
 Thein Hanh 
 Ronnie Min Kiat
 Shahreen Che Omar
 Alisher Usmanov

Knockout stage

All times are Thailand Standard Time (UTC+07:00).

In all matches in the knockout stage, if the score were level at the end of 90 minutes, If the score were still level after 90 minutes, the match was decided by a penalty shoot-out.

Semi-finals

Third place play-off

Final

Goalscorers
 2 goals
 Kroekrit Thaweekarn
 1 goal

 Baha' Abdel-Rahman
 Hamza Al-Dardour
 Mohannad Khairullah
 Abdul Fattah Al Agha
 Mahmoud Maowas
 Hamid Mido
 Teerasil Dangda
 Mongkol Tossakrai
 Sultan Al-Shamsi

Winners

Broadcasting rights

References

2016
2016 in Thai football cups
Sport in Bangkok